Lumbini Engineering College is an engineering college in Tilottama Municipality, ward no. 9 Rupandehi District, Lumbini Zone, Nepal. It was established in 2000.  The college has received accolades through Pokhara University, as well as the government's ministry of education.  It is also an ISO 9001:2015 certified college.  Nepal Engineering Council has ranked this college highly in its evaluation every year. There are well-equipped laboratory facilities and facilities for researching cells, robotics; these programs are endorsed by members of the civil engineering society.

References 

Engineering universities and colleges in Nepal
Lumbini Zone
2000 establishments in Nepal
Buildings and structures in Rupandehi District

External links 

 Website